Jake Wardle (born 18 November 1998) is an English professional rugby league footballer who plays as a  for the Wigan Warriors in the Betfred Super League, and England and the England Knights at international level.

He previously played for the Huddersfield Giants in the Super League and has spent time on loan from Huddersfield at the Warrington Wolves in the top flight.

Background
Wardle was born in Halifax, West Yorkshire, England

He is the younger brother of fellow former Giants player Joe Wardle.

Playing career

Huddersfield Giants
Wardle is a product of Huddersfield's academy system Wardle made his Huddersfield début in round 14 of the 2016 Super League season against Catalans Dragons at the Stade Gilbert Brutus.

In 2020, Wardle signed a new contract to stay at Huddersfield until the end of the 2023 season.

Warrington Wolves (loan)
On 25 June 2022 it was announced that he would join the Warrington Wolves for the remainder of the 2022 season.

Wigan Warriors
In October 2022 it was announced that Wardle had joined Wigan Warriors on a three-year deal.

References

External links
Huddersfield Giants profile
SL profile

1998 births
Living people
England national rugby league team players
England Knights national rugby league team players
English people of Scottish descent
English rugby league players
Huddersfield Giants players
Rugby league centres
Rugby league players from Halifax, West Yorkshire
Warrington Wolves players
Wigan Warriors players